The 11th Army Corps, is a tactical formation of the Coastal Troops of the Russian Navy, formed in 2016 as part of the Baltic Fleet, in the  Western Military District.

The corps is located in Kaliningrad Oblast, with its headquarters in the city of Gusev.

The corps was formed on 1 April 2016, and operates from Kaliningrad Oblast.

On 1 February 2021 the revival of the 75th Guards Motor Rifle Regiment at Sovetsk (until 1946 - the city of Tilsit), formerly part of the 40th Guards Tank Division, was reported. It was reported that the new regiment would form part of the newly forming motor rifle division of the 11th Army Corps, likely a revived 1st Guards Motor Rifle Division. Sovetsk is located on the banks of the Neman River on the border with Lithuania, where the shortest land route to the border with the main part of Russia begins.

The Corps included an artillery brigade (with BM-27 Uragan and BM-30 Smerch heavy rocket launchers), missile and motor rifle brigades, and regiments for tanks, motor rifle and air defense.

After February 24, 2022, the Corps was committed to the 2022 Russian invasion of Ukraine. On 26th October 2022, Reuters published a special report regarding the defeat and retreat of an 11th Army detachment under colonel Ivan Popov and thousands of documents left in a base in Balakliia after the Ukrainian eastern Kharkiv counteroffensive 6-8th September. 

In October 2022 American military correspondent David Axe claimed that the 11th Army Corps was destroyed during the 2022 Russian invasion of Ukraine and would "almost certainly require many months to rest, re-equip and induct draftees in order to regain even a fraction of its former strength."

Composition
Headquarters Staff (Gusev)
18th Guards Motor Rifle Division (Gusev and Sovetsk)
244th Artillery Brigade (Kaliningrad)
 (Chernyakhovsk) The brigade traces its history back to the 3rd Fighter Brigade of the 2nd Fighter Division of the Red Army. The “baptism of fire” for the brigade was the Battle of Kursk. Twelve soldiers were awarded the Hero of the Soviet Union.  The 3rd Fighter Brigade was raised to Guards status on August 10, 1943, with the same original number retained. The formation was in the ranks of the operational army at the front from June 12, 1942 to August 10, 1943 and from September 14, 1943 to May 9, 1945. Initially, the unit was formed as the 3rd Fighter Brigade, then it became the 3rd Guards Fighter Brigade and eventually reorganized in 1943 into the 3rd Guards Anti-Tank Artillery Brigade. After the war, the brigade was in the Group of Soviet Forces in Germany and reported directly to the command of the Group of Forces. The formation was stationed in the area of Strelitz-Alt (or Alt-Strelitz) (:de:Strelitz-Alt / Altstrelitz) in Neustrelitz, Mecklenburg-Vorpommern in the German Democratic Republic. In the 1960s, the brigade was reorganized into a missile formation. In the late 1980s, in the process of disbanding the GSFG, the brigade (military unit 96759) was withdrawn to Chernyakhovsk, Kaliningrad Oblast.
 (Kaliningrad)
22nd Independent Guards Anti-Aircraft Missile Regiment (Kaliningrad)
46th Independent Reconnaissance Battalion (Gusev)
40th Independent Command Battalion (Gusev)

Commanders
Major-General  (2016 - 2020)
Major-General  (Since August 2020)

References

Works cited
 

Military units and formations established in 2016
2016 establishments in Russia
Army corps of the Russian Federation
Baltic Fleet